Francisco Miranda Concha (Madrid, 1869 - Barcelona, 1950) was a trade unionist and militant of the CNT in Barcelona.

Biography
He worked first as a miller and then as a bookbinder, and was the stepson of Anselmo Lorenzo Asperilla. A member of the Confederació Regional del Treball de Catalunya (CRTC), in 1904 he was part of the Workers' Center for Social Studies, chairing its Antimilitarist Committee.

He took an active part in the general strike that preceded the events of the Tragic Week of 1909, in such a way that some historians consider him the true leader in the shadows. Together with Jaume Aragó i Garcia, he organized a group on La Rambla that tried to assault the police station. He managed to escape the police siege and went abroad. He was imprisoned five days after the closure of the First Congress of the CNT (September 16, 1911) and when the CNT was outlawed (1913-1914) he was part of the clandestine commission of the CRTC that tried to reorganize it.

He attended the International Peace Congress held in Ferrol in May 1915, and in the autumn of 1915 was elected assistant secretary in the first committee of the CNT held in legality. He served as general secretary of the CRTC from mid-1916 until he took over as General Secretary of the CNT in March 1917. He was a member of the committee of the revolutionary general strike of August 1917, for which was imprisoned with Ángel Pestaña and Salvador Seguí. In July 1918 he left the general secretariat in the hands of Evelio Boal.

He was imprisoned again in January 1919 at the beginning of the Canadenca strike, and was imprisoned on the ship Pelayo in the port of Barcelona. On March 19, he took part in the rally in the bullring of Les Arenes, proposing on behalf of the prisoners the end of the strike. In February 1921 he was arrested again and imprisoned for almost two years.

References

1869 births
1950 deaths
Spanish anarchists
Politicians from Madrid
Secretaries General of the Confederación Nacional del Trabajo
Spanish trade unionists